Skoroszyce  is a village in Nysa County, Opole Voivodeship, in south-western Poland. It is the seat of the gmina (administrative district) called Gmina Skoroszyce.

The village has a population of 1,400.

References

Skoroszyce